was a village located in Higashiiwai District, Iwate Prefecture, Japan. The village was famous for the annual Firework Festival in August and the E-Boat Race in early September.

Kawasaki village was created on September 30, 1956 by the merger of the villages of Usuginu and Kadozaki. On September 20, 2005, Kawasaki, along with the towns of Daitō, Higashiyama and Senmaya, the village of Murone (all from Higashiiwai District), and the town of Hanaizumi (from Nishiiwai District), was merged into the expanded city of Ichinoseki, and no longer exists as an independent municipality.

As of September 2005, the village had an estimated population of 4,384 and a population density of 103.18 persons per km². The total area was 42.49 km².

External links
Official website 

Dissolved municipalities of Iwate Prefecture
Ichinoseki, Iwate